Angus Scott-Young (born 23 April 1997) is an Australian rugby union player who plays for the Northampton Saints in Premiership Rugby. He also played for Bay of Plenty in New Zealand's National Provincial Championship. His position of choice is loose forward. He is the son of former Wallaby Sam Scott-Young.

References 

Australian rugby union players
Australian expatriate sportspeople in England
1997 births
Living people
Rugby union players from Brisbane
Rugby union flankers
Queensland Country (NRC team) players
Queensland Reds players
Bay of Plenty rugby union players
Northampton Saints players